Hukuru Vileyrey, is a 2006 Maldivian romantic horror film directed by Aishath Rishmy and Aminath Rasheedha. Produced by Rasheedha under Yaaraa Productions, the film stars Yoosuf Shafeeu, Aishath Rishmy, Mariyam Azza and Zeenath Abbas in pivotal roles.

The film was based on a novel published by Ibrahim Waheed in Haveeru Daily in 2003. The film was a critical and commercial success while being considered "one of the few acceptable horror movies the Maldives film industry has ever produced". The film was later released as a 15 episode  television series with the inclusion of several clips that were cut from the cinema version.

Premise
Fairooz (Yoosuf Shafeeu), an aspiring author is happily married to his amusing wife Nahidha (Mariyam Azza) and blessed with a daughter. He once decided to write a novel about his friend, Rasheed (Ahmed Saeed) who has been possessed since childhood. The evil spirit (Zeenath Abbas) was expulsed from Rasheed's soul, bewitching Fairooz during the process of exorcism. After this the sprit kept haunting Fairooz.

Cast 
 Yoosuf Shafeeu as Fairooz
 Aishath Rishmy as Nahidha
 Aminath Rasheedha as Fauziyya Shakir
 Zeenath Abbas as an evil spirit
 Mariyam Azza as Azza
 Ahmed Saeed as Rasheed
 Chilhiya Moosa Manik as Adam Manik
 Abdulla Muaz as Zaid
 Mariyam Shahuza as Yusra
 Mariyam Zuhura as Fazna
 Aishath Nashwa as Haifa
 Ahmed Shafeeu
 Aflah Shah
 Khalidha Adam
 Aminath Shareef (Special appearance)

Soundtrack

Accolades

References

2006 films
2006 horror films
Maldivian horror films
Yaaraa Productions films